Behzad may refer to:

Places in Iran
Bagh-e Behzad, a village in Javanmardi Rural District, Khanmirza District, Lordegan County, Chaharmahal and Bakhtiari Province
Behzad Kola, a village in Qareh Toghan Rural District, Central District, Neka County, Mazandaran Province
Darreh-ye Behzad, a village in Darreh Kayad Rural District, Sardasht District, Dezful County, Khuzestan Province
Hajji Behzad, a village in Zarrineh Rud-e Shomali Rural District, Central District, Miandoab County, West Azerbaijan Province

People

Given name
Behzad Farahani (born 1945), Iranian actor and screenwriter
Behzad Gholampour (born 1966), Iranian football and Futsal player
Behzad Khodadad (born 1981), Iranian Taekwondo athlete
Behzad Mirkhani (born 1969), Iranian guitarist and composer
Behzad Nabavi (born 1941), Iranian reformist politician
Behzad Ranjbaran (born 1955), Iranian composer
Behzad Razavi (fl. 1985–2012), Iranian-American professor and researcher of electrical and electronic engineering
Behzad Soltani, Iranian football player with F.C. Sepahan

Surname
Hossein Behzad (1894–1968), Iranian painter
Kamāl ud-Dīn Behzād (c. 1450–c. 1535), Persian painter and head of the royal ateliers in Herat and Tabriz during the late Timurid and early Safavid Persian periods
Mahmoud Behzad (1913–2007), Iran scientist and biologist
Mehdi Behzad (born 1936), American-Iranian mathematician

See also
Behzadi (disambiguation)